The 2002–03 Ivy League men's basketball season was the Ivy League's 49th season of basketball. The team with the best record (Penn Quakers) progressed to the 2003 NCAA Men's Division I Basketball Tournament. Penn's Ugonna Onyekwe won his second consecutive Ivy League Men's Basketball Player of the Year.

Standings

Team stats

References